KLWG (88.1 FM) is a non-commercial radio station that is licensed to and serves Lompoc, California. The station is owned by Calvary Chapel of Lompoc and broadcasts a Christian talk and teaching format.

History
KLWG was signed on in May 2005 by Calvary Chapel of Lompoc with a Christian talk and teaching format. It is one of two religious stations licensed to serve Lompoc; the other is Christian rock-formatted KRQZ.

KLWG airs programming with an emphasis on Bible teaching, as well as contemporary Christian music. Most of the teaching programs are produced by pastors from Calvary Chapel of Lompoc or other Calvary Chapel congregations throughout the United States.

References

External links

LWG
Radio stations established in 2005
2005 establishments in California